The 2004 Baqubah bombing occurred next to a local market and a police station on 28 July 2004, in Baquba, Diyala Governor, targeting civilians that were lined up waiting to sign up as police volunteers. According to witnesses, a suicide car bomber rammed his vehicle into the queue outside the building and detonated the explosive charges. The force of the blast was huge and destroyed a minivan that was parked nearby, killing all 21 people inside. A total of 68 Iraqis perished in the attack and scores more were wounded. The city of Baqubah went on to become an important center for the Iraqi insurgency and was declared to be the center of operations for the Al-Qaeda in Iraq in late 2003 – early 2006, then it became a major location for Islamic State of Iraq , before US troops moved in and forced the group to relocate. It was the site of almost daily incidents, including major attacks in 2004–2005, 2008 and 2010.

See also
List of terrorist incidents, 2004
2008 Baquba bombings
2010 Baqubah bombings

References

2004 murders in Iraq
21st-century mass murder in Iraq
Bombings in the Iraqi insurgency
Islamic terrorist incidents in 2004
Mass murder in 2004
Suicide car and truck bombings in Iraq
Terrorist incidents in Iraq in 2004
Diyala Governorate
July 2004 events in Iraq
Attacks on police stations in the 2000s
Building bombings in Iraq